Submariner may refer to:
A sailor who is a crew member of a submarine
A baseball pitcher who pitches with an underhand motion
Namor the Sub-Mariner, a comic-book character in the Marvel Comics Universe
Rolex Submariner, a Rolex diving watch model
Submariner (album), a 2003 album by experimental-rock band The Dead Science
"Submariner", a song by Helen Marnie from the 2013 album Crystal World